Pakil, officially the Municipality of Pakil,  is a 5th class municipality in the province of Laguna, Philippines. According to the 2020 census, it has a population of 23,495 people.

Its land area consists of two non-contiguous parts, separated by Laguna de Bay.

History
The land from Punta Inuod to Guinabihan, Banilan is where the first settlers Gat Maitan and his wife Panumbalihan, and Gat Silayan Maginto and his wife Potongan first established themselves. After a series of raids by pirates and marauders, they moved to the present site of Poblacion, leaving behind Chief Maginoong Dalaga who ruled the place. This account explains why Pakil has two territories on the eastern and western sides of the lake. Gat Maitan and Gat Silayan are one of the borne-leaders from the ancient town of Malolos which was called by pre-colonial Chinese traders from Fujian as "Lihan" where Gats and Lacandolas abundantly reside along the shores of  Manila Bay under the Kingdom of Tondo. Gat Silayan actually is one of the members of the ruling clan of Lihan whose names bearing prefix "gat" a royal title. Every member of the clan in Malolos called "Gat", and it became "Gatchalian", Gatmaitan, together with Lakandula and Gatbonton at the course of time

When the Spaniard Conquistador together with the Augustinians stationed at Bay came to the place in 1571, this colony was under the leadership of Gat Paquil, a descendant of Gat Maitan whose name was used to name the settlement as "Paquil", which remained during the whole Spanish Regime and early part of the American period. It was changed to "Pakil" by Executive Order No. 77 in 1927.

When the Franciscan missionaries came in 1578 Order of Friars Minor  (OFM)  Pakil was attached to Paete in 1602 as its "visita". Padre Francisco Barajas, made efforts to separate this town from Paete, and Don Diego Jorge became the first Capitan Municipal or Gobernadorcillo on May 12, 1676, and finally Pakil was named as an independent town with the administration of "Capitan Municipal" at the helm of the local colonial government, the last of whom was Capitan Municipal Don Nicolas Regalado.

With the change of government from Spanish  to American upon the total Occupation of the United States in the Philippines after the defeat of the Filipino Forces in Philippine -American War of 1898–1900, the Americans had to reorganize the pattern of the Civil Government in the country in 1901. It was Bernardo Gonzales was appointed the first Municipal President (Presidente Municipal) under American Period until November 25, 1903. Upon this reorganization, the Public Law No. 1009, of the Philippine Commission, the town of Pakil was merged with Pangil in order to reduce the number of existing towns whereas the weak towns to be merged with the stable one for the stabilization of local economy due to the damages of the previous wars. After nineteen years, On October 1, 1927, by virtue of Executive Order No. 77, Pakil was re-established into town thus the Municipality of Pakil was restored.

Japanese occupation

The Japanese occupation of the Philippines (Filipino: Pananakop ng mga Hapones sa Pilipinas; Japanese: 日本のフィリピン占領; Hepburn: Nihon no Firipin Senryō) occurred between 1942 and 1945, when Imperial Japan occupied the Commonwealth of the Philippines during World War II.

The invasion of the Philippines started on 8 December 1941, ten hours after the attack on Pearl Harbor. As at Pearl Harbor, American aircraft were severely damaged in the initial Japanese attack. Lacking air cover, the American Asiatic Fleet in the Philippines withdrew to Java on 12 December 1941. General Douglas MacArthur was ordered out, leaving his men at Corregidor on the night of 11 March 1942 for Australia, 4,000 km away. The 76,000 starving and sick American and Filipino defenders in Bataan surrendered on 9 April 1942, and were forced to endure the infamous Bataan Death March on which 7,000–10,000 died or were murdered. The 13,000 survivors on Corregidor surrendered on 6 May.

Japan occupied the Philippines for over three years, until the surrender of Japan. A highly effective guerilla campaign by Philippine resistance forces controlled sixty percent of the islands, mostly jungle and mountain areas. MacArthur supplied them by submarine, and sent reinforcements and officers. Filipinos remained loyal to the United States, partly because of the American guarantee of independence, and also because the Japanese had pressed large numbers of Filipinos into work details and even put young Filipino women into brothels.[1]

General MacArthur kept his promise to return to the Philippines on 20 October 1944. The landings on the island of Leyte were accompanied by a force of 700 vessels and 174,000 men. Through December 1944, the islands of Leyte and Mindoro were cleared of Japanese soldiers. During the campaign, the Imperial Japanese Army conducted a suicidal defense of the islands. Cities such as Manila were reduced to rubble. Around 500,000 Filipinos died during the Japanese Occupation Period.[2]

In 1942, the Japanese troops occupied in Pakil, Laguna and in 1945, the liberated from the Philippine Commonwealth forces under the Philippine Army and Philippine Constabulary entering in Pakil, Laguna with the local recognized guerrillas against the Japanese forces during the Second World War.

In 1954, the sitios known as Casa Real, Casinsin and Kabulusan were converted into barrios. Durado followed suit in 1957.

Geography

Barangays
Pakil is politically subdivided into 13 barangays.

 Baño (Poblacion)
 Banilan
 Burgos (Poblacion)
 Casa Real
 Casinsin
 Dorado
 Gonzales (Poblacion)
 Kabulusan
 Matikiw
 Rizal (Poblacion)
 Saray
 Taft (Poblacion)
 Tavera (Poblacion)

Climate

Demographics

Economy

Culture
Music was formally initiated in the town of Pakil by San Pedro Bautista (1586) the Guardian of the Franciscan order. He established the only Music Academy in the country. The school started with 400 children from towns along the Laguna Bay.
These students started as church choir members and were taught how to make musical instruments out of locally available materials like bamboo, cans, wood and coconut shells. These kids were called “Tiple” and they trained other younger children to become members of the church choir.

The entire population became involved in teaching their youth to sing and play instruments. This tradition was handed down from generation to generation. The Adonay family influenced the spread of musical interest and helped form the first brass band in Pakil.

The elderly Tacio Celis helped train children to read musical notes and play instruments. Since then, many young musicians finished college on scholarships by playing for their school bands.

Currently Pakil Music Program is helping out young students to continue the rich musical heritage of the town. Pakil Music Program (PMP) is providing music education through note reading and instrument performances with the help of some retired musicians. The current executive director of the PMP is Mr. Roy Regalado.

Religion

St. Peter of Alcantara Parish

The St. Peter of Alcantara Parish, also the Diocesan Shrine of the Our Lady of Turumba is Pakil's  Roman Catholic Church and home to the Our Lady of Sorrows de Turumba.

Our Lady of Turumba 

Nuestra Señora de los Dolores de Turumba ("Our Lady of Sorrows of Turumba") is the name for a specific statue of the Virgin Mary as Our Lady of Sorrows, enshrined in Pakil.

Liceo de Pakil

Liceo de Pakil is a private sectarian Catholic high school originally established by the Maryknoll Fathers in 1956. At first, the school was named Maryknoll Fathers High School following the namesake of its leaders. When the Maryknoll Fathers had to go to their mission in Davao, they ceded the leadership to the Maryknoll Sisters who subsequently changed the school's name into Maryknoll High School. Upon the termination of the mission of the Maryknoll Sisters in 1972, Bishop Pedro N. Bantigue invited the Augustinian Recollect Sisters to administer the school. The name was changed again to Mary Immaculate Academy by the Augustinian Recollect Sisters. In 1982, the school's name was changed to Liceo De Pakil by the Diocese of San Pablo. The first batch to graduate under Liceo de Pakil was the batch of 1983 graduating class. In 1986, the administration of the school was passed on to the Missionary Catechists of St. Therese (MCST). Liceo De Pakil is currently under the administration of the MCST and the Diocese of San Pablo.

Notable personalities

 Marcelo Adonay - major Philippine composer and church musician.
 Danilo Echavaria Dalena - modern and contemporary painter.
 Jun Regalado - one of the most prolific drummers in the Philippines.

References

External links

 [ Philippine Standard Geographic Code]
 Philippine Census Information
 Local Governance Performance Management System

Municipalities of Laguna (province)
Populated places on Laguna de Bay
1676 establishments in the Spanish Empire
Populated places established in 1676